Travis John Thomas (born December 3, 1984) is a former American football running back. He was signed by the Cleveland Browns as an undrafted free agent in 2008. He played college football at Notre Dame.

Early years
Thomas graduated from Washington High School after a stellar football career. He won SuperPrep All-American honors, with a total of 2730 rushing yards, 25 receptions for 420 yards, and 56 touchdowns in his career. He also played outside linebacker in 2002 and made 137 tackles, which helped bring his team to a 15-0 season and a Pennsylvania Class AA state title. He was awarded MVP two years, and also won the scholar-athlete award at the U.S. Army All-American Bowl.

College career
During the 2005 College Football season, Thomas saw action chiefly on special teams (in all 12 games) and also as a reserve halfback (in 10 games). As halfback he rushed 63 times for 248 yards with a total of five touchdowns. On special teams, he made a total of 132 appearances throughout the season with seven tackles.

In 2006, he was moved to the position of linebacker because of his speed and physicality with Coach Charlie Weis's blessing and was appointed captain of special teams. He proved valuable to the Irish as a flexible player with his ability to play both offense and defense.

Thomas moved back to halfback for the 2007 season and was named a captain along with Tom Zbikowski, Maurice Crum Jr., John Sullivan, and John Carlson. He served primarily as a goalline back and led the team in rushing touchdowns.

Professional career

Cleveland Browns
Thomas went undrafted in the 2008 NFL Draft and was subsequently signed by the Cleveland Browns. He was waived/injured on August 30.

References

External links
Cleveland Browns bio
Notre Dame Fighting Irish bio 

1984 births
Living people
People from Washington, Pennsylvania
American football running backs
American football linebackers
Notre Dame Fighting Irish football players
Cleveland Browns players
Players of American football from Pennsylvania